William Ehrlich (born Vilmos Ehrlich 23 April 1928 - 27 December 2021) was a survivor of the Holocaust, professional soccer player, defector of the 1956 Hungarian Revolution, owner of the Pennsylvania Stoners soccer team, and President of the Bicycle Corporation of America.

Life
Willie Ehrlich was born to Dezső and Ilona Ehrlich (née Gráner), both Ashkenazi Jews in Újpest, Hungary. His father was the supervisor of the maintenance department at Tungsram, a manufacturer of small electrical components. His mother, Ilona, was a housewife. 

Willie’s extended family was very large. Together, his parents had nine siblings, most of them married. 

Like many or most jews living in Hungary, Willie and his family saw themselves as Hungarians first and jews second. They did not speak yiddish or keep kosher, and Willie’s hebrew was so poor that his bar mitzvah was performed in Hungarian. 

His father was deported to the Soviet Union in 1942 as part of the Hungarian Munkaszolgálat program, which required jewish men perform forced labor for the Hungarian Military.

Living people
1928 births
Auschwitz concentration camp survivors
American Soccer League (1933–1983) coaches
Hungarian emigrants to the United States
American soccer coaches